Pirate's Passage is a 2015 Canadian animated adventure film based on the 2006 children's book of the same name by William Gilkerson. It premiered on CBC Television on 4 January 2015.

Plot
The story is set in 1952 in the fictional community of Grey Rocks, Nova Scotia, where 12-year-old Jim faces bullying at school. His widowed mother runs a local inn, which is facing a takeover by a wealthy family. Sea captain Charles Johnson appears to assist Jim and his mother through their struggles. However, Johnson appears to be a pirate who supposedly died two centuries ago.

The story is based on William Gilkerson's book Pirate's Passage, which won the 2006 Governor General's Award for English-language children's literature.

Voice Cast
 Donald Sutherland as Captain Charles Johnson
 Gage Munroe as Jim Hawkins
 Carrie-Anne Moss as Kerstin Hawkins
 Megan Follows as Meg O’Leary
 Kim Coates as Roy Moehner
 Colm Feore as Corporal Robin Hawkins
 Gordon Pinsent as Harry Freelove, The Barber
 Paul Gross as Calico Jack
 Rossif Sutherland as Klaus Moehner
 Terry Haig as Mr. Herkes

Production
Pirate's Passage was produced and written by Sutherland and Brad Peyton through Sutherland's production company Martin's River Ink and the studios of PiP Animation Services.

Tandem Communications distributes the film outside of Canada.

References

External links

 
 Pirate's Passage at Tandem Communications

2015 television films
2015 films
2015 animated films
2010s adventure films
2010s animated television specials
2010s Canadian films
2010s English-language films
Adventure television films
Animated adventure films
Animated films based on novels
Canadian children's adventure films
Canadian animated television films
CBC Television original films
English-language Canadian films
Films based on Canadian novels
Films based on children's books
Films scored by Andrew Lockington
Films set in 1952
Films set in Nova Scotia
Flash animated films
Pirate films
Television films based on books
Canadian children's animated films